Maulana Abdul Haq Baloch (5 January 1947-16 March 2010) was a Pakistani Islamic scholar and politician from Kech District, Balochistan. He served as member of the National Assembly of Pakistan from 1985–1988,belongs to Jamat e Islami.

References

1947 births
2010 deaths
Baloch people
People from Kech District
Jamaat-e-Islami Pakistan politicians
Pakistani MNAs 1985–1988
Jamia Darul Uloom, Karachi alumni